Fear of flying is a fear of being on an airplane, or other flying vehicle, such as a helicopter, while in flight. It is also referred to as flying anxiety, flying phobia, flight phobia, aviophobia, aerophobia, or pteromechanophobia (although aerophobia also means a fear of drafts or of fresh air).

Acute anxiety caused by flying can be treated with anti-anxiety medication.  The condition can be treated with exposure therapy, which works better when combined with cognitive behavioral therapy.

Signs and symptoms
People with fear of flying experience intense, persistent fear or anxiety when they consider flying, as well as during flying.  They will avoid flying if they can, and the fear, anxiety, and avoidance cause significant distress and impair their ability to function.  Take-off, bad weather, and turbulence appear to be the most anxiety provoking aspects of flying.

The most extreme manifestations can include panic attacks or vomiting at the mere sight or mention of an aircraft or air travel.

Around 60% of people with fear of flying report having some other anxiety disorder.

Cause
The causes of flight phobia and the mechanisms by which it is maintained were not well understood .  It is not clear if it is really one condition; it appears to be heterogenous. It appears that some people get aerophobia from being or having claustrophobia to the small spaces inside the fuselage of the plane or helicopter.

Diagnosis
The diagnosis is clinical.  It is often difficult to determine if the specific phobia of fear of flight should be the primary diagnosis, or if fear of flying is a symptom of a generalized anxiety disorder or another anxiety disorder such as agoraphobia or claustrophobia.

Classification
Fear of flying is a specific phobia classified as such in the DSM-5.

Management
Acute anxiety caused by flying can be treated with anti-anxiety medication.  The condition can be treated with exposure therapy, including use of virtual reality equipment, which works better when combined with cognitive behavioral therapy.  Relaxation techniques and education about aviation safety can also be helpful in combination with other approaches.

A new and advanced treatment for aviophobia is virtual reality exposure therapy. This type of treatment uses computer technology where the patient enters a virtual reality of flying.

Virtual reality exposure therapy 
Effective treatment for phobias such as fear of flying would be one that activates and modifies the fear structure. Activation of the fear structure can be achieved by exposing the patient to the feared stimuli, flying in this case, to elicit the fearful response. Modification of the fear structure can be achieved by the processes of habituation and extinction after eliciting the fearful response several times. A new and advanced treatment for aviophobia is virtual reality exposure therapy (VRET). This type of treatment uses computer technology where the patient virtually experiences flying. This experience includes visual, auditory, and motion stimuli to imitate flying in a plane as close as possible. Thus, VRET is considered an effective treatment for aviophobia. While it can be argued that vivo exposure treatment, patients being exposed to an aircraft, is the most effective way of treatment, but VRET is more cost-effective, accessible, less time-consuming, and requires less organization. Another advantage of VRET over vivo exposure treatment is that it focuses on the main reason that elicits fear of flying easily. For example, if the patient's most anxiety-inducing-component is takeoff, in VRET the patient would be exposed to a plane takeoff repeatedly while in vivo exposure the patient would have to wait for the plane to land and then take off again.

Outcomes
Studies of interventions like CBT have reported rates of reduction in anxiety of around 80%; however, there is little evidence that any treatment can eliminate fear of flying.

Epidemiology
Estimates for prevalence have ranged between 2.5% and 40%; estimates on the lower end are probably generated through studies where the condition is diagnosed by a professional, and the higher end probably includes people who have diagnosed themselves.

History
Fear of flying was first discussed in the biomedical literature by a doctor in the UK at the end of World War I, who called it "aero-neurosis" and was describing pilots and crew who were or became anxious about flying. It was not much discussed until the 1950s and rise of commercial air travel and the vogue in psychoanalysis. Starting in the 1970s fear of flying was addressed through behavioral and cognitive approaches.

Following the September 11 attacks, Americans chose to travel more by car instead of flying; because of the extra traffic, around 350 more people died in traffic accidents than would have normally occurred.

Research directions
, the causes of fear of flying as well as the psychological mechanisms through which it were persists had not been well researched. A few studies had looked at whether mechanisms like illusory correlation and expectancy bias were present in all or most people with fear of flying as well as other specific phobias; these studies have not led to clear outcomes.

Research into the most effective ways to treat or manage fear of flying is difficult (as it is with other counselling or behavioral interventions) due to the inability to include a placebo or other control arm in such studies.

See also
 List of phobias
 Health hazards of air travel
 Flight shame

References

Aviation medicine
Flying